General Crawford may refer to:

Charles Crawford (United States Army officer) (1866–1945), U.S. Army brigadier general
Kenneth Crawford (1895–1961), British Army general
Patrick Crawford (1933–2009), British Army major general
Robert W. Crawford (1891–1981), U.S. Army major general
Samuel W. Crawford (1829–1892), Union Army brigadier general and brevet major general

See also
Attorney General Crawford (disambiguation)
Charles Craufurd (1763–1821), British Army lieutenant general
James Craufurd (British Army officer) (1804–1888), British Army lieutenant general
Robert Craufurd (1764–1812), British Army major general